Nikolai Vladimirovich Remizov (in Saint-Petersburg – 4 August 1975 in Riverside County), also known as Nicolai Remisoff, was a Russian and Russian and American artist, political cartoonist and art director of American cinema. He worked a number of times one films directed by fellow Russian Gregory Ratoff.

Selected filmography
 Of Mice and Men (1939)
 Captain Caution (1940)
 Turnabout (1940)
 My Life with Caroline (1941)
 The Men in Her Life (1941)
 Broadway Limited (1941)
 Topper Returns (1941)
 The Corsican Brothers (1941)
 Something to Shout About (1943)
 The Heat's On (1943)
 Guest in the House (1944)
 Madame Pimpernel (1945)
 Young Widow (1946)
 The Strange Woman (1946)
 Dishonored Lady (1947)
 Lured (1947)
 No Minor Vices (1948)
 When I Grow Up (1951)
 The Moon Is Blue (1953)
 Please Murder Me (1956)
 Johnny Concho (1956)
 Pawnee (1957)
 Undersea Girl (1957)
 Black Patch (1957)
 Pork Chop Hill (1959)
 Ocean's 11 (1960)

References

Bibliography 
 Mary Lackritz Gray &  Franz Schulze. A Guide to Chicago's Murals. University of Chicago Press, 2001.
 Joseph R. Millichap. Lewis Milestone. Twayne Publishers, 1981.

External links 
 

1887 births
1975 deaths
Russian art directors
American art directors
White Russian emigrants to the United States
Artists from Saint Petersburg
Russian cartoonists
Russian editorial cartoonists
Russian caricaturists
White Russian emigrants to France